Centre Hill Historic District is a national historic district located at Petersburg, Virginia. The district includes 81 contributing buildings located in a predominantly residential section of Petersburg. It includes a varied collection of early-19th-century to early-20th century houses and includes notable examples of Greek Revival, Italianate, Colonial Revival, and Bungalow style architecture.  Notable buildings include the Centre Hill Apartment Building (1915), Eichberg House, Powell House, Unger House, and St. Joseph's Convent.  Located in the district and separately listed is the Centre Hill Museum.

It was listed on the National Register of Historic Places in 1986.

References

Historic districts on the National Register of Historic Places in Virginia
Greek Revival architecture in Virginia
Colonial Revival architecture in Virginia
Italianate architecture in Virginia
Buildings and structures in Petersburg, Virginia
National Register of Historic Places in Petersburg, Virginia